Dowlatabad (also Romanized as Dowlatābād; also known as Dowlatābād-e Marvdasht and Dowlat Abad Marvdasht) is a village in Kenareh Rural District, in the Central District of Marvdasht County, Fars Province, Iran. At the 2006 census, its population was 1,247, in 298 families.

References 

Populated places in Marvdasht County